Abrotanella emarginata is a member of the daisy family and is  found in southern Argentina, southern Chile, Falkland Island and New Guinea.

References

Flora of Chile
Flora of the Falkland Islands
Flora of New Guinea
emarginata